Brandon Tyler (born October 16, 1988 in Portland, Oregon) is an American soccer player currently playing for New Orleans Jesters in the National Premier Soccer League.

Career
Tyler grew up in Arizona, where he played for the successful Phoenix-based youth club, Santos FC. Tyler did not play college soccer and instead embarked on his professional soccer career straight out of high school. He spent most of 2007 training with Centro Atlético Fénix of the Uruguayan Premier Division, before signing a contract with New England Revolution after impressing the coaching staff during an extended trial in the 2008 preseason and early regular season.

Tyler made his professional debut for Revolution on 1 July 2008, in a US Open Cup third round game against Richmond Kickers. After a brief period on loan with USL Second Division side Western Mass Pioneers Tyler was released by New England, having never played a MLS league game.

After spending a year playing in amateur leagues, Tyler signed to play with USL Premier Development League expansion side GPS Portland Phoenix in 2010.

References

1988 births
Living people
Soccer players from Portland, Oregon
New England Revolution players
Western Mass Pioneers players
GPS Portland Phoenix players
New Orleans Jesters players
USL Second Division players
USL League Two players
Association football defenders
American soccer players